Damion Searls is an American writer and translator. He grew up in New York and studied at Harvard University and the University of California, Berkeley. He specializes in translating literary works from Western European languages such as German, Norwegian, French, and Dutch. Among the authors he has translated are Marcel Proust, Rainer Maria Rilke, Robert Walser, Ingeborg Bachmann, Thomas Bernhard, Kurt Schwitters, Peter Handke, Jon Fosse, Heike B. Görtemaker, and Nescio. He has received numerous grants and fellowships for his translations. 

Searls published the first English-language biography of Hermann Rorschach, inventor of the Rorschach test, in 2017. He won the Helen and Kurt Wolff Translator's Prize in 2019 for Uwe Johnson's Anniversaries: from a Year in the Life of Gesine Cresspahl.

In April 2022, the English translation by Searls of Jon Fosse's novel A New Name: Septology VI-VII was shortlisted for the International Booker Prize.

Searls lives in Brooklyn, New York City.

Selected works

Author
 Everything You Say Is True: A Travelogue
 What We Were Doing and Where We Were Going
 The Inkblots

Translator/editor
 Alfred Döblin, Bright Magic: Stories
 André Gide, Marshlands (New York Review Books, 2021)
 Christa Wolf, City of Angels or, The Overcoat of Dr. Freud
 Clemens Berger, Angel of the Poor, a comedy
 Dubravka Ugrešić, Thank You For Not Reading (co-translated with the author and Celia Hawkesworth)
 Dubravka Ugrešić, Lend Me Your Character (co-translated with the author and Celia Hawkesworth and Michael Henry Heim)
 Elfriede Jelinek, Her Not All Her (winner of the 2011 Austrian Cultural Foundation NY Translation Award)
 Hans Keilson, Comedy in a Minor Key (National Book Critics Circle Award finalist; New York Times Notable Book of 2010; Salon.com Best Book of the Year; winner of the 2011 Schlegel-Tieck Translation Prize)
 Hans Keilson, Life Goes On
 Heike B. Görtemaker Eva Braun : Life with Hitler  (Vintage Books, New York 2011)
 Henry David Thoreau, The Journal (NYRB Classics)
 Hermann Hesse, Demian (Penguin Classics)
 Ingeborg Bachmann, Letters to Felician
 Jon Fosse, Aliss at the Fire (PEN Center USA Translation Award)
 Jon Fosse, Melancholy (co-translated with Grethe Kvernes)
 Marcel Proust and John Ruskin, On Reading
 Mirjam Pressler with Gerti Elias, Anne Frank's Family: The Extraordinary Story of Where She Came From
 Nescio, Amsterdam Stories (NYRB Classics; winner of awards from PEN Translation Fund, the Netherland America Foundation, and the Dutch Literature Fund)
 Rainer Maria Rilke, The Inner Sky: Poems, Notes, Dreams (2007 National Endowment for the Arts in Translation)
 Robert Walser, A Schoolboy's Diary and Other Stories (NYRB Classics)
 Susanne Kippenberger, Kippenberger: The Artist and His Families
 Thomas Mann, New Selected Stories (Liveright, 2023)
 Uwe Johnson, A Trip to Klagenfurt: In the Footsteps of Ingeborg Bachmann with Youth in an Austrian Town by Ingeborg Bachmann
 Uwe Johnson, Island Stories: Writings from England
 Uwe Johnson, Anniversaries: from a Year in the Life of Gesine Cresspahl (NYRB Classics, 2018)
 Saša Stanišić, Where you come from

References

American translators
Harvard University alumni
People from Brooklyn
Year of birth missing (living people)
Living people